KTMY (107.1 FM) is an entertainment-oriented talk radio station, serving the Twin Cities as well as portions of West Central Wisconsin. The station is owned and operated by Hubbard Broadcasting. KTMY's studios and offices are located on University Avenue, along the boundary line between St. Paul and Minneapolis, and its transmitter is located at Telefarm Towers in Shoreview, Minnesota, off County Road F West.

Station history
The station was originally licensed to serve New Richmond, Wisconsin, as WIXK-FM, simulcasting the country music format of that city's WIXK. Hubbard Broadcasting bought both stations in 2000 for $27 million, and moved WIXK-FM to the immediate Twin Cities area, where the station's city of license was changed from New Richmond to Coon Rapids, Minnesota, and its transmitter moved to the Telefarm installation in Shoreview.

On June 3, 2002, WIXK-FM adopted the WFMP call sign and dropped country in favor of a talk format, originally branded as "FM 107" ("real. life. conversation."), that emphasized issues, topics, and conversations that catered to a female audience.  The original "FM 107" schedule included national call-in/advice shows featuring Dr. Laura Schlessinger, Dr. Joy Browne, and Clark Howard, but locally produced programming would make up a majority of the schedule in later years.

The "myTalk 107.1" branding officially went into effect in February 2010.

MyTalk has been recognized for its loyal listening base.

The original myTalk lineup was Ian and Margery (morning drive), Colleen and The Boys (mid-morning), Jason and Alexis (afternoons), Lori and Julia (afternoon drive), and Brian and Shelletta (evenings from 7:00-9:00P.M.). The Brian and Shelletta show was cancelled in July 2010. The 7:00-9:00P.M. slot was replaced by a Jason and Alexis show rebroadcast. Colleen and The Boys (hosted by Colleen Kruse, Chris Reuvers, and G.R. Anderson) was cancelled March 2012, and the time slot was replaced by the Colleen and Bradley show (hosted by Colleen Lindstrom and Bradley Traynor).

In 2007, the station heeded a call from condemned inmate Philip Workman to have vegetarian pizza delivered to homeless residents of Nashville, Tennessee.

HD Radio
KTMY has been broadcasting a HD radio signal since October 2011.  The station's HD-2 sub-channel aired a simulcast of the sports format of sister station KSTP (AM); that simulcast moved to a sub-channel of KSTP-FM in December 2013. The HD2 is now simulcasting the oldies format of Borgen Broadcasting-owned WDGY.

References

External links
KTMY official website

Hubbard Broadcasting
Radio stations in Minnesota